is a passenger railway station in located in the town of Inami, Hidaka District, Wakayama Prefecture, Japan, operated by West Japan Railway Company (JR West).

Lines

Station layout
The station consists of one side platform and one island platform connected to the station building by a footbridge. The station is staffed.

Platforms

Adjacent stations

|-
!colspan=5|West Japan Railway Company (JR West)

History
Inami Station opened on December 14, 1930. With the privatization of the Japan National Railways (JNR) on April 1, 1987, the station came under the aegis of the West Japan Railway Company.

Passenger statistics
In fiscal 2019, the station was used by an average of 155 passengers daily (boarding passengers only).

Surrounding Area
 
 Inami Town Hall
 Inami Elementary School
 Inami Municipal Inami Junior High School
 Inami Post Office

See also
List of railway stations in Japan

References

External links

 Kirime Station Official Site

Railway stations in Wakayama Prefecture
Railway stations in Japan opened in 1930
Inami, Wakayama